The Karl Renner Haus is a former mountain hut and now a sport hotel in the Kitzbühel Alps in Austria. It lies in the upper Saalach valley (Land Salzburg) on the edge of Saalbach-Hinterglemm at about 1,100 m above sea level and is managed by the Friends of Nature.

History 
The Karl Renner Haus is named after the former Austrian politician and co-founder of the Friends of Nature, Karl Renner. It was financed from membership fees, ERP credits and a mountain hut lottery and opened on 15 August 1952.
In the period of economic boom in the 1950s and 60s the Karl Renner Haus was a much sought-after holiday destination, but suffered from 1985 onwards because it had no access for motor vehicles due to the absence of the necessary repairs. This finally led to a new building being put up in 2006/07 and the Karl Renner Haus was opened again on 12 October 2008 as a sport hotel by the Friends of Nature.

External links
Hut description 
Haus brochure (Photos of the sport hotel) 
Hut finder

References 

Mountain huts in Austria
Kitzbühel Alps
Zell am See District
Buildings and structures in Salzburg (state)
Economy of Salzburg (state)